This article lists the main target shooting events and their results for 2021.

World Events

Olympic & Paralympic Games
The 2020 Olympic Games & 2020 Paralympic Games were held in Tokyo, following their postponement in 2020.
 Shooting at the 2020 Summer Olympics – Qualification
 Shooting at the 2020 Summer Olympics
 Shooting at the 2020 Summer Paralympics – Qualification
 Shooting at the 2020 Summer Paralympics

International Shooting Sport Federation
 September 27 - October 10: 2021 ISSF Junior World Championships held in Lima, Peru

ISSF World Cup
 2021 ISSF World Cup

International Practical Shooting Confederation
 2021 IPSC Action Air World Shoot was delayed until 2022, when it should have been held in Sochi, Russia. Was cancelled following Russian invasion of Ukraine.

FITASC
2021 Results

Regional Events

Africa

Americas

Junior Pan American Games
 November 26-28: Shooting at the 2021 Junior Pan American Games in Cali, Colombia

Asia

Asian Shooting Championships
 September 12-19: 2021 Asian Airgun Championships in Shymkent, Kazakhstan

Europe

European Shooting Confederation
 May 22 - June 5: 2021 European Shooting Championships in Osijek, Croatia

"B Matches"
 December 8-11: RIAC returned after 2020 cancellation in Strassen, Luxembourg.

National Events

United Kingdom

NRA Imperial Meeting
 July, held at the National Shooting Centre, Bisley
 Queen's Prize winner: 
 Grand Aggregate winner: 
 Kolapore Winners: 
 National Trophy Winners: 
 Elcho Shield winners: 
 Vizianagram winners: House of Commons

USA
 2021 NCAA Rifle Championships, won by Kentucky Wildcats

References

 
2021 in sports
2021 sport-related lists
2020s in shooting sports